Push Interactions is a Canadian provider of Mobile App Development services, design and analysis.  Established in 2009 the company is known for providing mobile apps for financial, retail, transportation, education and the medical industries.  Formerly known as CollegeMobile  the company is based in Saskatoon, Saskatchewan, Canada and was founded in 2009.  The company has created mobile apps in use by over 500,000 users worldwide.  Founders of the company were also included in the iUsask project at the University of Saskatchewan.  Company has been named to Canada's top 25 Canadian Up and Coming ICT Companies among other awards.

References

External links
 Push Interactions Website

Online companies of Canada